Baghdad Central is a British crime thriller television series set in Iraq and first broadcast in 2020. It was based on the 2014 novel by Elliott Colla, and adapted by Stephen Butchard. It was directed by Alice Troughton. The executive producer was Kate Harwood

Plot
The series is set in Iraq in 2003, shortly after the ousting of Saddam Hussein. It centres on a former policeman, Muhsin al-Khafaji (Waleed Zuaiter), as he tries to find his missing daughter, Sawsan (Leem Lubany). He is mistakenly arrested and tortured by United States troops but then recruited by a former British policeman, Frank Temple (Bertie Carvel), to become a police officer in the Green Zone.

Main cast  
 Waleed Zuaiter as Muhsin al-Khafaji
 Bertie Carvel as Frank Temple
 Clara Khoury as Professor Zubeida Rashid
 Leem Lubany as Sawsan
 July Namir as Mrouj
 Tawfeek Barhom
 Charlotte Spencer
 Corey Stoll as John Parodi
 Neil Maskell as Douglas Evans

Recurring cast
 Fady Elsayed as Ibrahim Jabani

Production 
Filming began in September 2018, and took place in Morocco, including in the cities of Ouarzazate, Rabat, Casablanca and Mohammedia.

Broadcast
Baghdad Central was first broadcast on Channel 4 in February 2020. In the United States, it has been broadcast on Hulu.

Reception
Baghdad Central has received mostly positive reviews according to aggregator websites, scoring 78 on Metacritic and 90 per cent on Rotten Tomatoes as of May 2020. Zuaiter was a nominee for the leading actor award in the 2021 British Academy Television Awards.

References

External links

2020 British television series debuts
2020 British television series endings
2020s British crime drama television series
2020s British television miniseries
British thriller television series
Channel 4 television dramas
English-language television shows
Iraq War in television
Neo-noir television series
Television series about missing people
Television series based on American novels
Television series by Euston Films
Television series by Fremantle (company)
Television series set in 2003
Television shows filmed in Morocco
Television shows set in Iraq